Hugo Romero (born 11 October 1946) is an Ecuadorian sports shooter. He competed at the 1984 Summer Olympics, the 1988 Summer Olympics and the 1992 Summer Olympics.

References

1946 births
Living people
Ecuadorian male sport shooters
Olympic shooters of Ecuador
Shooters at the 1984 Summer Olympics
Shooters at the 1988 Summer Olympics
Shooters at the 1992 Summer Olympics
Place of birth missing (living people)
Pan American Games medalists in shooting
Pan American Games bronze medalists for Ecuador
Shooters at the 1991 Pan American Games
Medalists at the 1991 Pan American Games
20th-century Ecuadorian people